There are a number of documents titled De fide Catolica. Among them are:

 The edict "De fide catholica" issued by Emperor Theodosius on 27 February 380, establishing Christianity as the official religion of the Roman empire
 The tractate De fide catholica of Boethius (480-524 or 525)
 De fide catholica ex Veteri et Novo Testamento contra Iudaeos by Isidore of Seville (560-636)
 The Summa contra Gentiles, also known as Tractatus de fide catholica, contra contra errores infidelium, of Thomas Aquinas (1225-1274)
 The constitution "De fide catholica" of the First Vatican Council, also called Dei Filius
 A form of belief in the Catholic faith

Documents of the Catholic Church
Latin religious words and phrases